Jonne Järvelä (born 3 June 1974 in Vesilahti) is the vocalist/guitarist of the Finnish band Korpiklaani. He is known in the folk metal scene for his yoiking and contributed the yoik on the Finntroll album, Jaktens Tid. He was once a member of the Sami music group Angelin tytöt. In 2011 he appeared in the song "Humppa Is My Neighbour" by the Russian band Troll Bends Fir and in the song "Leszek a Hold" by the Hungarian band Dalriada, in 2012 he played on the Varg Song "A Thousand Eyes" of the Guten Tag album.

References

1974 births
Living people
People from Vesilahti
Finnish heavy metal singers
Finnish Sámi people
Finnish Sámi musicians
21st-century Finnish singers
21st-century guitarists